The Powerade Tigers first participated in the Philippine Basketball Association (PBA) Draft as  Coca-Cola Tigers, on January 13, 2002, months before their first PBA season. The Tigers bought the original franchise of the Pop Cola Panthers in 2002 after Pop-Cola disbanded after the 2001 season. Coca-Cola received the rights for all of the Pop-Cola's players and draftees.

Rafi Reavis became the team's first draft choice, the 2nd pick in the 2002 PBA Draft. Different with the former expansion teams, Coke immediately won the All-Filipino Championship during their first season.

In Coca-Cola/Powerade stint, they have never received a number-one pick.

Selections

Notes
1.All players entering the draft are Filipinos until proven otherwise.
2.Coca-cola have traded all of their draft rights to other teams from the 2007 to 2009 drafts.

References

Philippine Basketball Association draft